Government Central High School or Attakulangara Central School was founded in 1889. It is located in Trivandrum, the capital of Kerala province in India. The school's curriculum is in the Malayalam and Tamil languages. As of 2019, the school had just 100 students and was in a dilapidated state, with planned renovations halted amidst reports of disagreements  over payments and construction details.

In 2020, the government began housing 223 homeless people on the school's campus. They have been active since, clearing and grubbing the grounds and cultivating vegetables.

References

External links 
 Save Our School

High schools and secondary schools in Thiruvananthapuram